Sanusi may refer to:

Dynasty 
 the Senusiyya, a Sufi order and Libyan dynasty, also spelled Sanusi
 Sayyid Muhammad ibn Ali as-Senussi (1787–1859), founder of the dynasty
 Ahmed Sharif as-Senussi (1873 – 1933), third head of the dynasty

Family name 
 Muhammadu Sanusi, Emir of Kano from 1953 to 1963, grandfather of Sanusi Lamido Sanusi
 Sanusi Lamido Sanusi (born 1961), Governor of the Central Bank of Nigeria from 2009 to 2014 and Emir of Kano from 2014 to 2020.
 Joseph Oladele Sanusi (born 1938), Governor of the Central Bank of Nigeria from 1999 to 2004
 Anthony Saliu Sanusi (1911-2009), Nigerian catholic bishop
 Ryan Sanusi (born 1992), Belgian footballer
 Abidemi Sanusi, contemporary Nigerian author

Given name 
 Sanusi (cyclist) (born 1933), Indonesian Olympic cyclist
 Sanusi Pane (1905-1968), Indonesian writer, journalist, and historian
 Sanusi Mahmood (1909-1995), first Mufti of Singapore
 Sanusi Dantata (1919-1997), Nigerian businessman of Kano state
 Mohammed Sanusi Daggash (born 1960), Nigerian architect and politician, currently Minister of Works and Housin
 Muhammad Sanusi Md Nor (born 1974), 14th Menteri Besar of Kedah